A juniorate is a secondary school for young people planning to enter religious life.

Roman Catholic
For Sisters of the Servants of Mary, juniorate study lasts 6 years from the completion of the novitiate.

See also
 Novitiate

References

External references
 Former Catholic schools in the Diocese of Burlington

School types